is a Japanese singer and songwriter signed with SME Records' Newcome Inc. She debuted on February 20, 2008, with the single "I". 

Often considered one of Japan's most popular female singers of the late 2000s and 2010s, she gained early popularity with the R&B singles "Tookutemo" (with rapper WISE) and "Kimi ni Aitaku Naru Kara". Her first studio album, "LOVE one." (2009), debuted at number four on charts and went on to become certified platinum. She achieved further success with her sophomore and first number-one album, "To Love" (2010), which was preceded by the singles "Motto...", "Dear...", "Best Friend" and "Aitakute Aitakute" which were all certified "million" for full song downloads of over 1 million by the Recording Industry Association of Japan (RIAJ), establishing Nishino as a dominant force on music charts and digital platforms. The album, certified platinum three times, became the third best-selling album of 2010 and the single "Aitakute Aitakute" was the best-selling digital song of the year. While enjoying continuous mainstream success with her following records "Thank You, Love" (2011), "LOVE Place" (2012) and "with LOVE" (2014), Nishino's music also evolved from R&B to pop.

In the mid-2010s, she successfully ventured into country pop with the singles "Darling" (2014) and "Torisetsu" (2015). The latter, the theme song of the live action film Heroine Shikkaku, became the best-selling digital song of 2015 with over one million copies sold. She subsequently released the albums "Just LOVE" (2016) and "LOVE it" (2017), certified platinum and gold respectively. In 2016, she won the Grand Prix at the 58th Japan Record Awards for her single "Anata no Suki na Tokoro", the first female solo artist to do so since Koda Kumi in 2005. In 2017, she reached a new milestone when becoming the youngest female solo artist and the first female one born in the Heisei era to perform at the prestigious Tokyo Dome as part of the "Kana Nishino Dome Tour 2017 Many Thanks". 

Due to her popularity with the Japanese female audience, Nishino appears frequently on fashion magazine covers and she is often regarded as a "style icon". It was particularly apparent in her early days due to her association with the Gyaru fashion subculture, leading her music to be referred to as "Gyaru Enka" ("Gyaru heartbreak songs"). In 2009, CNN said that she was the favorite singer of teenage girls in Shibuya, Tokyo. Nishino is also known for her "relatable" lyrics about love. She was awarded "Artist of the Year" two times in 2014 and 2015 by Billboard Japan. Since her debut, she has sold over six million records and over 46 million downloads, making her one of the most successful female artists in the digital chart history of Japan. 

On January 8, 2019, Nishino announced an "indefinite" hiatus starting on February 3 of the same year.

Biography

1989–2007: Early life and career beginnings
Nishino studied English from an early age, and went to America twice. She became interested in various genres of music, including hip-hop, R&B and reggae, but she also enjoyed Japanese literature, and started singing Japanese folk songs. Her dream of becoming a singer started in junior high school. When she was 16, her mother secretly sent a demo tape of hers to the  organized by Sony Music, and she was rated the top singer entrant out of approximately 40,000 applicants. In 2006, she was signed to SME Records.

2008–2010: Debut and Breakthrough
In 2007, while preparing to be a singer, she was also studying English literature at college. At the time, she met Australian duo Nervo, who offered Nishino a song called "I Don't Wanna Know" for use in her music project. Nishino rewrote the song's lyrics into Japanese herself, and re-titled it "I".

In December 2007, her official site opened, and from that time onwards "*I* ~Merry Christmas ver.~" was available as a digital download from several Japanese sites, including Mora. The original version of the song "I Don't Wanna Know" was available as a digital download on the American iTunes site from New Year's Day onwards. The physical version was released two months later, on February 20, 2008.

Nishino's second single was called "Glowly Days". Her third single, "Style", was used as the second ending theme song for the anime series Soul Eater and her fourth single "Make Up" is used in the ONA Chocolate Underground from UK's miniseries Bootleg with one of its b-sides, "Kirari", as an insert song.

After her first four singles, her music took a more R&B feel to it. Her fifth single "Tōkutemo feat. Wise" was released as a full-track digital song (Chaku Uta Full) on March 11, 2009. The physical CD was released on March 18, 2009. It is her first physical single to enter the top 50 in the Japanese Oricon single charts. Wise's digital single "Aenakutemo feat. Kana Nishino" debuted at number 9 on the RIAJ Digital Track Chart.

Nishino released her sixth single "Kimi ni Aitaku Naru Kara" on June 3, 2009. The single hit number 14 on the Oricon weekly single charting, being her best single release of the six. The digital version of the single debuted at number 5 on the RIAJ Digital Track Chart.

Her album Love One. was released on June 24, 2009, and features all six singles, a b-side, "Celtic", a pro and epilogue (featuring "kirari"), along with five completely unreleased songs: "doll" (track 3), "Girlfriend" (track 4), "Kimi no Koe o feat. Verbal (M-Flo)" (track 5), "Life goes on..." (track 7), and "candy" (track 9). "Kimi no Koe o" reached number 5 on RIAJ's digital track charts.

Nishino released her seventh single "Motto...". The full-track ringtone digital download of the song began on October 14 and the physical CD was released on October 21, 2009. The song debuted at the number 1 spot on the RIAJ Digital Track Chart. She released the double A-side single "Dear.../Maybe" on December 2, 2009. After releasing two more singles "Best Friend" and "Aitakute Aitakute", she released her second album To Love on June 23, 2010.

On August 4, 2010, Kana Nishino released her eleventh single, "If." This song was used as the theme and ending song of the movie "Naruto Shippuden 4: The Lost Tower".The single reached number 5 on the Oricon charts and sold over 85,000 copies. Her 12th single, "Kimi tte", was released on November 3, 2010.

2010–2013: Big success in Japan with Thank you, Love, Love Place, and more

Kana competed in the 61st Kohaku Uta Gassen, which took place on December 31, 2010, with "Best Friend." On February 9, 2011, the single "Distance" was released. She also collaborated with Wise on the single "By your side" which was released on March 16, 2011. Two months later on May 18, 2011, her new single "Esperanza" was released. On June 22, 2011, her third studio album Thank you, Love was successful on the Oricon charts by being number 1 during its first week. It sold 178,006 copies the first week and remained classified 67 weeks for a total of 376,102 copies sold. It contains four of his singles and eight new tracks. It comes out in CD and CD + DVD format, on DVD we can find the four clips of his four singles. Haruna Takekawa from "hotexpress" has been expressing Nishino's emotions and gaining a lot of sympathy until now, but criticized that it is proved by this work that she is now a step further. did. Also, "Alright" was mentioned as a song that he would like to note. In spring of 2012, Nishino's cute looks have her in the magazines "CUTiE" "JELLY", "JJ", "Popteen", "Ray", and "ViVi" (in alphabetical order). In September 2012, Nishino released her 4th album called Love Place. It was released in two versions: a limited CD+DVD edition and a regular CD-only edition. The song "Be Strong" was used to promote the album. The album was later re-released in Taiwan in a big package version including a unique 2013-year desk calendar. The album won the Best Prize in the "Grand Prix record Nippon! Shining 54th" latest original album "Love Place".

2013–2014: Best albums and box albums

Although her singles were downloaded several times, her physical single sales started to decline. Six months later, Kana released two more singles: "Believe" in June followed by "Namidairo" in August. To celebrate her 5th anniversary in the music industry, Kana announced her two best albums, Love Collection ~pink~ and Love Collection ~mint~, to be released simultaneously on September 4, 2013. The mint version reached #1 on the Oricon charts, with the pink version charting at #2. The two albums sold almost 650,000 copies. A month later, she released another single, "Sayonara". She was the best-selling female solo artist in Japan for the year.

Seven months later into 2014, she released her 23rd single "We Don't Stop". The single reached #2 on the Oricon charts selling 33,000 copies. In August, she released her country music-themed single "Darling". The single reached #6 on the Oricon charts selling more than 42,000 copies and was certified Triple Platinum for being downloaded more than 750,000 times, becoming one of her more recent hit songs. She eventually released the ballad "Suki", which reached #9 on the Oricon charts selling only 24,803 copies. In November, she released her fifth album with LOVE. The album reached #1 on the Oricon charts selling almost 270,000 copies. For the year, she was the 2nd best-selling female solo artist.

2015–2016: Japan Record Awards win and other projects 
After the long chart run of her single "Darling", she released another country music-themed single in April called "Moshimo Unmei no Hito ga Iru no Nara". The single only reached #11 on the Oricon charts but managed to sell almost 42,000 copies. The single was certified Double Platinum for being downloaded more than 500,000 times by May 2016. After the release of this single, her physical single sales started to increase again.

In September, Kana released another country music-themed single "Torisetsu". The single was used as the theme song for the movie Heroine Shikkaku and reached #6 on the Oricon charts. This is also her first single that was able to sell more than 25,000 copies in its first week since "GO FOR IT!!" as well as her best selling single since "Kimi tte" released in 2010. The RIAJ has certified the single Gold for shipment of over 100,000 copies.

On November 18, she released another pair of best-of albums: Secret Collection ~RED~ and Secret Collection ~GREEN~, containing only b-sides of previously released singles and albums. The green version reached #2 on the Oricon charts, and the red version placed #3, selling almost 250,000 copies as a pair. A new song "No.1" was used as the title track for the show Okitegami Kyoko no Biboroku and was certified Platinum for being downloaded more than 250,000 times. She was the best-selling female solo artist in Japan in 2015 with 303,365 copies sold.

Her 28th single "Anata no Suki na Tokoro" was released on April 27, 2016. The single reached #5 on the Oricon charts selling almost 33,000 copies. On July 13, she released her sixth studio album Just LOVE. The album reached #1 on Oricon charts with first week sales of almost 127,000 copies. Nishino won her first grand prize for the song at the 58th Shining! Japan Record Awards held on December 30 of the same year. On October 26, the 29th single " Dear Bride " was released. Was held in December of the same year 5 days, " the 49th Japan Cable Awards his first at" the same song Grand Prize was awarded the same year.

2017–2019: 10th anniversary, hiatus and marriage

Nishino was selected as a winner of the "2016 ISUM Bridal Music Awards" held on March 15, 2017. 

On April 8 the same year, the 10th-anniversary calendar “KANA NISHINO 10th ANNIVERSARY MEMORIAL CALENDAR” was released. Nishino has decided to hold her first solo two-large dome tour, "Kana Nishino Dome Tour 2017" Many Thanks". Kyocera Dome Osaka on August 26 and 27, 2017 and Tokyo on September 23 and 24, 2017. The dome performed 2 performances each, and a total of 160,000 people were mobilized in all 4 performances. 

On August 26 the same year, as described above, on the first day of the first two major dome tours, the 32nd single “Reason for holding hands” (released October 18) and the 7th album “LOVE it” (released November 15, 2017). 

It is announced that it will be released in autumn. From May 19, 2018 to July 25, 2018, Nishino performed her first National Hall Tour 2018 “LOVE it Tour” (26 performances) for the first time in seven years. ~ 10th Anniversary ~ '(12 performances) held 38 performances, mobilizing a total of 200,000 people. 

On October 4, the 10th anniversary of her debut, it will be announced that the two best albums "Love Collection 2-mint-" and "Love Collection 2-pink-" will be released simultaneously on November 21 for the first time in 5 years. Following the release of the best album on October 10, the special live  Kana Nishino Love Collection Live 2019.

LOVE it Tour-10th Anniversary  – "at the same arena, the venue for the final performance. On December 25, the live viewing of Kana Nishino Love Collection Live 2019.

On January 8, Nishino announced that she will taking an indefinite hiatus on her official Twitter, official website and official fan club. On February 3, the activity was suspended with the performance of "Kana Nishino Love Collection Live 2019" at the Yokohama Arena. Nishino announced that she married her former manager on her 30th birthday.

Discography 

Studio albums
 2009: Love One.
 2010: To Love
 2011: Thank You, Love
 2012: Love Place
 2014: With Love
 2016: Just Love
 2017: Love It

Compilation albums
 2013: Love Collection: Pink
 2013: Love Collection: Mint
 2015: Secret Collection: Red
 2015: Secret Collection: Green
 2018: Love Collection 2: Pink
 2018: Love Collection 2: Mint

Million download certification by RIAJ 
Excluding ringtone (short version) in this Table.

Awards

MTV Video Music Awards Japan

|-
| 2010
| Motto..
| Best Karaokee! Song
| 
|-
| rowspan="2" style="text-align:center;"|2011
| Kimitte
| Best Pop VideoBest Karaokee! Song
| 
|-
| To Love
| Best Album
| 
|-
| rowspan="2" style="text-align:center;"|2012
| Tatoe Donna ni..
| Best Female Artist Video
| 
|-
| Esperanza
| Best Karaokee! Song
| 
|-
| rowspan="3" style="text-align:center;"|2013
| Always
| Best Female Artist Video
| 
|-
| Love Place
| Best Album
| 
|-
| Always
| Best Karaokee! Song
| 
|-
| 2014
| Believe
| Best Pop Video
| 
|-
| rowspan="3" style="text-align:center;"|2016
| Anata no Suki na Tokoro
| Best Female Artist Video
| 
|-
| Just Love
| Best Album
| 
|-
| Anata no Suki na Tokoro
| Best Pop Video
| 
|-
| rowspan="1" style="text-align:center;"|2017
| Pa
| Best Female Artist Video
| 
|-
|}

Japan Record Awards
The Japan Record Awards is a major music awards show held annually in Japan by the Japan Composer's Association.

|-
| 2010
| to LOVE
| Excellence Album Award
| 
|-
| rowspan="2" style="text-align:center;"|2011
| rowspan="2" | Esperanza
| Grand Prix
| 
|-
| Excellent Work Award
| 
|-
| rowspan="3" style="text-align:center;"|2012
| rowspan="2" | GO FOR IT!!
| Grand Prix
| 
|-
| Outstanding Works Award
| 
|-
| Love Place
| the Best Album Award
| 
|-
| rowspan="2" style="text-align:center;"|2013
| rowspan="2" | Sayonara
| Grand Prix
| 
|-
| Outstanding Works Award
| 
|-
| rowspan="2" style="text-align:center;"|2014
| rowspan="2" | Darling
| Grand Prix
| 
|-
| Outstanding Works Award
| 
|-
| rowspan="2" style="text-align:center;"|2015
| rowspan="2" | Torisetsu
| Grand Prix
| 
|-
| Outstanding Works Award
| 
|-
| rowspan="2" style="text-align:center;"|2016
| rowspan="2" | Anata no Sukina Tokoro
| Grand Prix
| 
|-
| Outstanding Works Award
| 
|-
|}

Japan Cable Awards

|-
| 2010
| Kimitte
|rowspan="7" style="text-align:center;" | Music Excellence Award
| 
|-
| 2011
| Tatoe Donna ni...
| 
|-
| 2012
| Watashitachi
| 
|-
| 2013
| Sayonara
| 
|-
| 2014
| Darling
| 
|-
| 2015
| Torisetsu
| 
|-
|rowspan="2" |  2016
|rowspan="2" | Dear Bride
| 
|-
| 
| 
|-
| 2017
| Te Wo Tsunagu Riyuu
| 
| 
|-
|}

Japan Gold Disc Award

|-
| rowspan="4" style="text-align:center;"|2011
| to LOVE
|  Best 5 Albums
| 
|-
| Aitakute Aitakute
| Song Of The Year By Download
| 
|-
| if
| rowspan="2"| Best 5 Songs By Download
| 
|-
| Best Friend
| 
|-
| style="text-align:center;"|2013
| Tatoe Donna ni...
| Best 5 Songs By Download
| 
|-
| style="text-align:center;"|2015
| Darling
| Best 5 Songs By Download
| 
|-
| rowspan="3" style="text-align:center;"|2016
| rowspan="2" | Torisetsu
| Song Of The Year By Download
| 
|-
| Best 5 Songs By Download
| 
|-
| Moshimo Unmei no Hito ga Iru no Nara
| Best 5 Songs By Download
| 
|-
|}

Billboard Japan Music Awards

|-
| style="text-align:center;"|2010
| rowspan="3"|Kana Nishino
| Best Pop Artist
| 
|-
| style="text-align:center;"|2014
| rowspan="2"|Artist of the Year
| 
|-
| style="text-align:center;"|2015
| 
|}

Chinese Music Awards

|-
| style="text-align:center;"|2014
| Kana Nishino
| Asia’s Most Influential Artist 
| 
|}

References

External links

 Official website
 Official blog
 
RIAJ certification 

1989 births
Japanese women pop singers
Japanese lyricists
21st-century Japanese women singers
21st-century Japanese singers
Living people
Sony Music Entertainment Japan artists
Musicians from Mie Prefecture
People from Matsusaka, Mie